Kolkata Knight Riders (KKR) is a franchise cricket team based in Kolkata, India, which plays in the Indian Premier League (IPL). They were one of the nine teams that competed in the 2013 Indian Premier League. They were captained by Gautam Gambhir. Kolkata Knight Riders finished 7th in the IPL and did not qualify for the Champions League T20.

Background 
KKR were the defending champions but they had a disappointing IPL season in 2013, as they failed to make the play-offs, losing ten and winning only six out of their sixteen matches. Although the overall performance was disappointing, a few individual performances gained attention, like Sunil Narine who took 22 wickets in 16 matches and Gautam Gambhir who made some good runs. But due to lack of rhythm and perfect combination of players, and bad form of a few players, the KKR could not win few easy matches and ended up 7/9.

Indian Premier League

Season standings
Kolkata Knight Riders finished 7th in the league stage of IPL 2013.

Match log

References

2013 Indian Premier League
Kolkata Knight Riders seasons